Four to Doomsday is the second serial of the 19th season of the British science fiction television series Doctor Who, which was first broadcast in four twice-weekly parts on BBC1 from 18 to 26 January 1982.

The serial is set almost entirely on the spaceship of the alien Urbankan Monarch (Stratford Johns). In the serial, Monarch plots to invade Earth for its minerals using a deadly toxin to wipe out humanity so he can continue to make improvements to his ship.

Plot

The TARDIS materialises on board a vast and advanced spacecraft, observed by a hovering surveillance device which conveys the arrival of the crew to an observing being in control of the vessel. The TARDIS crew become separated and the Fifth Doctor and Tegan reach the bridge where the green-skinned commander introduces himself as Monarch, ruler of Urbanka, and his associates and fellow Urbankans are the Ministers of Enlightenment and Persuasion. The leader is intrigued by talk of current Earth civilisation and reveals their ship is bound for Earth. Shortly afterwards Enlightenment and Persuasion assume human forms, dressed in garments Tegan designed to demonstrate contemporary Earth fashions.

The TARDIS crew are reunited as guests, and it becomes apparent that there are four distinct human cultures represented on the vessel by a small group of humans – Ancient Greeks, the leader of whom is the philosopher Bigon; Chinese Mandarins and their leader Lin Futu; Princess Villagra and representatives of the Maya peoples; and Kurkutji and his tribesmen, of a very ancient Australian Aboriginal culture. The Urbankans have made periodic visits to Earth, each time getting speedier in their journeys. This time they have left their homeworld after erratic solar activity, storing three billion of their species on slides aboard their craft. It seems that the current journey is their last and that they now wish to settle on Earth, which they are due to reach in four days.

The Doctor becomes suspicious of Monarch and soon learns he does not plan on peaceful co-existence. Instead, he has developed a poison that reduces the intended in size to conquer Earth, which will be unleashed before the Urbankans disembark. He also learns that the humans aboard are not descendants of the original abductees, but are the original people taken from Earth and converted into androids, like the three Urbankans walking around on board. Monarch describes the era prior to his conversion of Urbankan life forms into cyborgs as the "flesh-time". The four leaders of the peoples have been given additional circuits to help them reason, but this facility can be taken away, as Bigon learns when he rebels against Monarch, and his neural circuit is removed and placed in a container for one hundred years. He explained to the Doctor that Monarch strip-mined and polluted Urbanka in a quest for minerals to improve the ship, and now plans to do the same to Earth. Monarch believes that if he can move the ship faster than the speed of light, he can pilot it back to the beginning of time and discover himself as God.

Adric, nevertheless, is rather taken with Monarch, and tensions between him and the Doctor become very strained. It takes The Doctor to break the tyrant's hold over the boy. The Doctor now sets about overthrowing Monarch and, with the help of the human androids led by a restored Bigon, a revolution is put into effect. Enlightenment and Persuasion are decircuited, while Monarch himself (whom the Doctor realises is still organic as there is an oxygen-producing flora chamber on the ship) is exposed to the poison and shrunk. The humanoid androids decide to pilot the vessel to a new home on a new world, while the TARDIS crew departs. Back in the console room, Nyssa suddenly collapses to the floor in a dead faint.

Production

The working title for this story was Days Of Wrath. Although Castrovalva was the first story aired which featured Peter Davison as the Fifth Doctor, this story was the first in the season to be produced.

It was originally decided that after Castrovalva, the Doctor would only have two companions, Adric and Tegan. As a result, the character of Nyssa was to be written out of the series at the end of this story. However, Peter Davison strongly opposed this move because he felt that Nyssa was the companion who was "most suited to his vision of the Doctor". Given this, producer John Nathan-Turner and the rest of the production team relented and Nyssa was retained. The story for the following serial Kinda was already developed with two companions and Nyssa was not featured in that narrative as written. Rather than a complete rewrite of Kinda to include Nyssa in the narrative, she remains absent much of that serial, said to be resting in the TARDIS. This was set up with Nyssa's collapse at the end of this story.

Cast notes
Kwouk later played Doctor Hayashi in the audio play Loups-Garoux while Paul Shelley appeared in The Whispering Forest.

Commercial releases

In print

A novelisation of this serial, written by Terrance Dicks, was published by Target Books in April 1983.

Home media

Four to Doomsday was released on VHS in September 2001. A DVD of the story was released on 15 September 2008. This serial was also released as part of the Doctor Who DVD Files in Issue 105 on 9 January 2013.

The serial was released on blu-ray in December 2018 as part of "The Collection - Season 19" box set.

Notes

References

External links

Target novelisation

Fifth Doctor serials
Doctor Who serials novelised by Terrance Dicks
1982 British television episodes
Fiction about consciousness transfer
Fiction set in 1981